Linkou (林口) may refer to:

Mainland China
Linkou County, of Mudanjiang, Heilongjiang
Linkou, Heilongjiang, county seat of Linkou County
Linkou, Guizhou, town in Qixingguan District, Bijie

Taiwan
Linkou District, rural district of New Taipei
Linkou Line, railway branch line, located in Taoyuan County and New Taipei
Linkou Station, station on the Linkou Line in Linkou District, New Taipei
New Taipei Municipal Lin-kou High School (formerly National Linkou High School), a high school in Linkou District, New Taipei